William Crampton Gore RHA (1871–1946) was an Irish painter.

The son of an army officer from Enniskillen, County Fermanagh, Gore studied medicine at Trinity College Dublin, graduating in 1897 and practising until 1901. An intervening period of some months in 1898 was spent studying art under Henry Tonks at the Slade School of Art, giving him a taste for life as a professional painter. After a stint abroad, during which he worked as a ship's surgeon on sailings to North America, India and Italy, he returned to London and the Slade, studying there from 1900 until 1904. Whilst there he befriended Sir William Orpen and Augustus John, sharing a studio with the latter. 

In 1905 he first exhibited with the RHA and from then until 1939 he contributed over a hundred works to their annual shows. In 1916 he was elected an Associate member of the RHA and in 1918 he was made a full member. 

His works were mainly interiors and still-lives in oils. Flower painting in particular attracted him, and it was on his encouragement that the Royal Horticultural Society of Ireland first hosted an exhibition of Flower and Garden Paintings at the Metropolitan School of Art in the 1940s. 

He was represented in many survey shows of Irish art, including the much-vaunted Irish Exhibition in Brussels in 1930. Examples of his work can be seen in the Limerick City Gallery of Art and the Hugh Lane Gallery in Dublin.

Sources 
 Whytes Biography of Irish Art and Irish Artists

1871 births
1946 deaths
19th-century Irish painters
20th-century Irish painters
Irish male painters
19th-century Irish male artists
20th-century Irish male artists